Alle kleuren (English: All Colours) is the second studio album by the Belgian music trio K3. The album was released on 15 September 2000 through label Niels William. The album became a massive hit in Flanders and the Netherlands: it reached the peak position in both the Dutch and Flemish album charts. A few months after the original release, a limited edition, with two extra songs and some karaoke versions of original songs, was released. In 2008 a reissue was released with the original songs and an extra CD with karaoke versions of the songs.

The first single from the album is called "Alle kleuren" and reached number two in the Ultratop 50. "Yippee yippee" is the second single from the album, a happy pop song. The third and fourth singles are "Oma's aan de top" and "Hippie shake".

Track listing

Personnel
Credits for Alle kleuren adapted from fan site.

 Kathleen Aerts – vocals
 Karen Damen – vocals
 Peter Gillis – text, music, production, drums
 Pietro Lacirignola – saxophone
 Patrick Mortier – trumpet
 Vincent Pierins – bass
 Patrick Steenaerts – guitar
 Alain Vande Putte – text, music
 Kristel Verbeke – vocals
 Rino Ver Eecke – vocals (radio voice-over)
 Alexia Waku – vocals (background)
 Miguel Wiels – text, music, production, keyboards

Chart performance

Weekly charts

Year-end charts

Certifications

References

2001 albums
K3 (band) albums